Bailu Subdistrict is a subdistrict in Yuehu District, Yingtan, Jiangxi, China. , it has 8 residential communities and 2 villages under its administration.

See also 
 List of township-level divisions of Jiangxi

References 

Township-level divisions of Jiangxi
Yingtan